The Broken Ridge or Broken Plateau is an oceanic plateau in the south-eastern Indian Ocean. The Broken Ridge once formed a large igneous province (LIP) together with the Kerguelen Plateau. When Australia and Antarctica started to separate, the Broken Ridge and the Kerguelen Plateau got separated by the Southeast Indian Ridge.  Alkalic basalt from the Broken Ridge has been dated to 95 Ma.

The Broken Ridge stretches  from the southern end of the Ninety East Ridge towards the south-western corner of Australia. It is separated from the Diamantina Fracture Zone on its southern side by a  escarpment, while on the northern side the ridge slopes gently towards the abyssal Wharton Basin. It is separated from the Naturaliste Plateau by the Dirck Hartog Ridge.

The Kerguelen LIP covered  making it the second largest LIP on Earth (after the Ontong Java Plateau in the Pacific).

The Kerguelen LIP has a long and complicated history, however, and is probably the least "typical" of all LIPs.
Rocks from both the Broken Ridge and the Kerguelen Plateau contain a continental component or "fingerprint".  In the Early Cretaceous, the Kerguelen hotspot was split into several diapirs of various sizes, composition, and ascent rates.  These separate diapirs created the Bunbury Basalt, the Southern Kerguelen Plateau, the Rajmahal Traps/Indian lamprophyres, Antarctic lamprophyres, and the Central Kerguelen Plateau/Broken Ridge.  In the late Cretaceous, activity in the mantle slowed and the Kerguelen hotspot was reduced to a single plume which created the Ninety East Ridge.

References

Notes

Sources

 
 
 
 

Large igneous provinces
Plateaus of the Indian Ocean
Cretaceous volcanism